The following is a list of the Japan national football team's competitive records and statistics.

Player records

Players in bold are still active with Japan.

Most capped players

Top goalscorers

Other records

Updated 29 March 2022

Youngest player
 Daisuke Ichikawa, 17 years and 322 days old, 1 April 1998 against 

Youngest goalscorer
 Shinji Kagawa, 19 years and 206 days old, 9 October 2008 against 

Youngest captain
 Gen Shoji, 24 years and 363 days old, 9 December 2017 EAFF E-1 Championship

Oldest player
 Eiji Kawashima, 39 years and 9 days old, 29 March 2022 against 

Oldest goalscorer
 Masashi Nakayama, 33 years and 326 days old, 15 August 2001 against 

Oldest captain
 Shigeo Yaegashi, 35 years and 203 days old, 13 October 1968 Summer Olympics

Most hat-trick
 8, Kunishige Kamamoto

Most goal in one match
 6, Kunishige Kamamoto, 27 September 1967 against 
 6, Kazuyoshi Miura, 22 June 1997 against 

Most goal in calendar year
 18, Kazuyoshi Miura, 1997

Manager records

Most appearances

Manager achievements

Team records
Updated 23 January 2015

 Biggest victory
 15–0 vs Philippines, 27 September 1967
 Heaviest defeat
 15–2 vs Philippines, 10 May 1917
 Most consecutive victories
 8, 8 August 1970 vs. Indonesia – 17 December 1970 vs. India
 8, 14 March 1993 vs. United States – 5 May 1995 vs. Sri Lanka
 8, 26 May 1996 vs. Yugoslavia – 12 December 1996 vs. China
 Most consecutive matches without defeat
 20, 24 June 2010 vs. Denmark – 11 November 2011 vs. Tajikistan
 Most consecutive defeats
 6, 10 June 1956 vs. South Korea – 28 December 1958 vs. Malaya
 Most consecutive matches without victory
 11, 13 August 1976 vs. Burma – 15 June 1976 vs. South Korea
 Most consecutive draws
 4, 13 August 1976 vs. Burma – 20 August 1976 vs. Malaysia
 Most consecutive matches scoring
 13, 19 December 1966 vs. Singapore – 16 October 1969 vs. Australia
 13, 7 February 2004 vs. Malaysia – 24 July 2004 vs. Thailand
 Most consecutive matches without scoring
 6, 18 June 1989 vs. Hong Kong – 31 July 1990 vs. North Korea
 Most consecutive matches conceding a goal
 28, 6 November 1960 vs. South Korea – 11 December 1966 vs. Iran
 Most consecutive matches without conceding a goal
 7, 19 November 2003 vs. Cameroon – 18 February 2004 vs. Oman

Competitive record
 Champions   Runners-up   Third place   Fourth place  

*Denotes draws includes knockout matches decided via penalty shoot-out. Red border indicates that the tournament was hosted on home soil. Gold, silver, bronze backgrounds indicate 1st, 2nd and 3rd finishes respectively. Bold text indicates best finish in tournament.

FIFA World Cup

AFC Asian Cup

Copa América
Japan is the first team from outside the Americas to participate in the Copa América, having been invited to the 1999 Copa América. Japan was also invited to the 2011 tournament and initially accepted the invitation. However, following the 2011 Tōhoku earthquake and tsunami, the JFA later withdrew on 16 May 2011, citing the difficulty of releasing some Japanese players from European teams to play as replacements. On the next day, CONMEBOL invited Costa Rica to replace Japan in the competition.

On 16 August 2013, CONMEBOL president Eugenio Figueredo announced that Japan was invited to the 2015 Copa América. However, Japan later declined the invitation due to scheduling problems.

On 14 May 2018, CONMEBOL announced that Japan, alongside Qatar, would be the two invited teams for the 2019 Copa América.

FIFA Confederations Cup

Olympic Games
Since 1992, the Olympic team has been drawn from a squad with a maximum of three players over 23 years age, and the achievements of this team are not generally regarded as part of the national team's records, nor are the statistics credited to the players' international records.

Asian Games
Football at the Asian Games has been an under-23 tournament since 2002.

Head-to-head record 
The list shown below shows the Japan national football team head-to-head record.
As of 5 December 2022.

Summary

AFC
As of 27 July 2022

CAF
As of 14 June 2022

CONCACAF
As of 27 November 2022

CONMEBOL
As of 27 September 2022

OFC
As of 12 October 2021

UEFA
As of 5 December 2022

See also

Japan
Men's
 International footballers
 National football team (Results (2020–present))
 National under-23 football team
 National under-20 football team
 National under-17 football team
 National futsal team
 National under-20 futsal team
 National beach soccer team
Women's
 International footballers
 National football team (Results)
 National under-20 football team
 National under-17 football team
 National futsal team

References

 
National association football team records and statistics